A digital factory uses digital technology for modeling, communications and to operate the manufacturing process. This arrangement of technology allows managers to configure, model, simulate, assess and evaluate items, procedures and system before the factory is constructed. The digital factory gives answers for configuration, design, screen and control of a production system.

Operation 
Specialists can plan items, check and  dissect assembly, manufacture-ability and serviceability. They can prepare automated and manual procedures for operating the facility. Procedures are confirmed and improved and plan mistakes remedied before beginning operations.

See also 
 Simulation in manufacturing systems
 Computer-aided manufacturing
 3D modeling

References

External links 
 Digital Factory Is Key To Increasing Manufacturing Capacity